The women's marathon at the 2012 Olympic Games in London was held on the Olympic marathon street course on 5 August.

The course started and finished on The Mall in central London. Runners completed one short circuit of 2.219 miles around part of the City of Westminster and then three longer circuits of 8 miles around Westminster, the Victoria Embankment and the City of London. The course was designed to pass many of London's best known landmarks, including Buckingham Palace, Trafalgar Square, St Paul's Cathedral, the Guildhall, Leadenhall Market, the Monument, the Tower of London and the Houses of Parliament.

Tiki Gelana from Ethiopia won the gold medal, completing the course in an Olympic record-breaking time of 2 hours 23 minutes 7 seconds. Kenya's Priscah Jeptoo finished second to win silver and Tatyana Petrova Arkhipova, representing Russia, took bronze.

Records
, the existing world and Olympic records were as follows:

The following new Olympic record was set during this competition:

Schedule
All times are British Summer Time (UTC+1)

Race overview
Starting in the rain, no athlete wanted to run hard from the start. Instead it was a large pack of runners, at times forming a wall across the streets.  The pack slowly whittled itself down by 12 km; the ever-present Valeria Straneo emerged to take the point position on the front. Over the next several kilometres, as the rain subsided, Xiaolin Zhu emerged as Straneo's shadow through the half marathon mark in 1:13:13.

Shortly after the half-way mark, Tiki Gelana fell trying to negotiate a water station.  Then the lead pack began to take a more serious focus with three Kenyans taking up the pace.  Gelana rejoined the pack. Though the pace again slowed, attrition continued. By 28 km the leaders were down to just the three Kenyans and two Ethiopians; Gelana and Mare Dibaba, with Priscah Jeptoo always on the outside. The first to crack was Dibaba. Meanwhile, the significantly less experienced Tatyana Petrova Arkhipova worked her way from far off the pace, past the rest of the athletes who had fallen out of the pack. Arkhipova caught the leaders from behind at 32 km. Just as  Arkhipova arrived, the reigning world champion Edna Ngeringwony Kiplagat fell back, though she worked her way back into the lead group a kilometre later.

At the 35 km water stop, Arkhipova accelerated, losing Kiplagat again, this time for good. It was a pack of four through the next 5 km. At 1500 m from the finish Mary Jepkosgei Keitany was the first from the group of four to fall off. At the same time, Gelana accelerated, leaving first Arkhipova, then Jeptoo. A grimacing Gelana powered home to narrowly beat the Olympic record. Tetyana Hamera-Shmyrko came from as far back as 23rd place to take fifth.

Result
Entrants as of 27 July 2012.

References

Athletics at the 2012 Summer Olympics
2012 Olympic Marathon
Marathons at the Olympics
Summer Olympics
2012 Summer Olympics
2012 in women's athletics
Women's events at the 2012 Summer Olympics